Zielenica  is a village in the administrative district of Gmina Górowo Iławeckie, within Bartoszyce County, Warmian-Masurian Voivodeship, in northern Poland, close to the border with the Kaliningrad Oblast of Russia. 

Above the village, towards the west, lays the highest hill in the area

A vast necropolis was located near Zielenica in the form of individual kurgans separated by several hundred meters. The first mounds, surrounded by a stone circle, were discovered in the late nineteenth century with richly decorated dishes and elements of bronze ornaments in them.

Population 
1933: 429
1939: 406
2008: 460

References

Zielenica